HMS Protector is a Royal Navy ice patrol ship built in Norway in mid 2000. As MV Polarbjørn (Norwegian: polar bear) she operated under charter as a polar research icebreaker and a subsea support vessel. In 2011, she was chartered as a temporary replacement for the ice patrol ship  and was purchased by the British Ministry of Defence in early September 2013. As DNV Ice Class 05 the vessel can handle first year ice up to 0.5 metres (20 in).

Service history (Norway)

Polarbjørn was designed and built for long Antarctic expeditions and for supporting subsea work. Polarbjørn was equipped to DP2 class and had accommodation for 100. Large cargo holds and open deck areas provide storage capacity for ROVs and related equipment. A 50-ton knuckle-boom crane and the 25-ton stern A-frame allow equipment to be deployed over the side and over the stern.

Polarbjørn worked in the "spot" market, on short-term charter. During 2009, the vessel was chartered for electromagnetic survey work in the North Sea, Norwegian Sea and Barents Sea. She was exposed to a downturn in business during 2010, with only a 33% utilization.

Prior to the Royal Navy charter, she underwent a ten-day refit in Odense, Denmark. The helicopter deck, originally above her bridge, was repositioned over the stern and a multibeam echosounder for survey work was installed. Her engines and gearboxes were overhauled and she was modified to allow the carriage of the ancillary vessels and vehicles (survey boats, all-terrain vehicles) used in support of the British Antarctic Survey.

Service history (Royal Navy)

From April 2011, she was chartered to the Royal Navy for three years as a temporary replacement for the ice patrol ship, and was renamed HMS Protector. The annual cost of the charter was £8.7m. In September 2013 the British Ministry of Defence purchased the ship outright from GC Rieber Shipping, for £51 million. In October 2013 the Ministry of Defence announced that from 1 April 2014 the ship's homeport would change from HMNB Portsmouth to HMNB Devonport, the location of the Hydrography and Meteorology Centre of Specialisation and where the Royal Navy's other survey ships are based.

She was commissioned into the Navy on 23 June 2011 as HMS Protector. The commissioning ceremony was held on the 50th anniversary of the date that the Antarctic Treaty came into force. During September 2011, Protector embarked on operational sea training in preparation for her first deployment in November.

In February 2012, after receiving a distress call from Comandante Ferraz Antarctic Station on King George Island in the South Shetland Islands, Protector sailed to provide assistance to the Brazilian research station after a large fire had broken out there. 23 of her sailors were put ashore with fire-fighting equipment to tackle the blaze. Two of the researchers died in the incident.

During March and April 2012, the ship operated in the vicinity of Rothera Research Station. During a major visit, she delivered around 170 cubic metres of aviation fuel. The crew competed in a 'winter Olympics' with scientists from the British Antarctic Survey.

On the way to her second Antarctic deployment, in October 2012 Protector surveyed the wreck of the Dale-class oiler  in James Bay, Saint Helena, as part of an assessment of its possible threat to the island's environment. On arriving in Antarctica in December, her designated Antarctic Treaty Observers supported an international team carrying out inspections of research stations to ensure compliance with the Antarctic Treaty.

The ship left for her third Antarctic deployment in October 2013. She revisited Rothera and then sailed across Marguerite Bay, reaching a latitude of 68° 12′ S,  from Cape Horn.

In the northern summer of 2014, the ship visited the Caribbean to perform training for humanitarian assistance, and also assisted some community projects in the British Virgin Islands.

In late 2015, Protector commenced a 20-month deployment to the Ross Sea for fisheries patrol and hydrographic survey operations. It is the first time that a Royal Navy or British Government vessel has operated in the waters south of Australia and New Zealand since 1936. In addition to the ship's usual equipment, three unmanned aerial vehicles (designed and 3D printed by the University of Southampton) were embarked. Sailing from Devonport, Protector visited the Seychelles and Diego Garcia en route (in the latter instance, becoming the first Royal Navy surface ship to visit in eight years) before proceeding to Tasmania, Australia. At the start of December, Protector departed from Hobart, Tasmania to commence fisheries patrols. In January 2016, the ship completed a five-week patrol of the Ross Sea conducting inspections in support of the Convention for the Conservation of Antarctic Marine Living Resources, with the aid of six embarked Australian and New Zealand specialists. The ship visited Zucchelli Station and reached a latitude of 77° 56′ S. Crew members visited Scott's Hut at Cape Evans. Protector circled the globe, covering more than 18,500 nautical miles, in 2016.

In November 2017, following a request for assistance from the Argentine government, Protector was redeployed to aid international efforts to locate the missing submarine .

In 2020 crew from the ship were trained aboard Canadian Coast Guard vessels in Arctic waters and renewed cooperation again in 2021.

Embarked equipment
Protector operates several small boats, including the survey motor boat James Caird IV, the ramped work boat Terra Nova and two Pacific 22 RIBs Nimrod and Aurora. She also embarks three BV206 all-terrain vehicles and a number of quad-bikes and trailers for activities on Antarctica, such as moving stores and equipment.

It has a crew of five, plus up to five passengers. The boat was named by Alexandra Shackleton, the granddaughter of Antarctic explorer Ernest Shackleton, during the commissioning ceremony for Protector on 23 June 2011. The boat's name commemorates the voyage of the James Caird made by Shackleton in 1916.

See also
Royal Research Ship
Standing Royal Navy deployments

References

External links 

 

 

2001 ships
Ships built in Norway
Icebreakers of the United Kingdom
Patrol vessels of the United Kingdom
Survey vessels of the Royal Navy
Merchant ships of Norway
Icebreakers of Norway
Research vessels
British Antarctic Survey